"Happy" is the fourth single to be taken from Indie band Travis' debut album, Good Feeling. Since the release of the single, until the end of 2007, "Happy" was typically used as the encore song during their live concerts. The single reached number 38 on the UK Singles Chart.

Track listing
 UK CD1
 "Happy" - 4:16
 "Unbelievers" - 3:49
 "Everyday Faces" - 3:48

 UK CD2 / 7" Vinyl / Cassette
 "Happy" - 4:16
 "When I'm Feeling Blue (Days of the Week)" - 3:25
 "Mother" - 2:28

References

1997 singles
Travis (band) songs
Songs written by Fran Healy (musician)
Song recordings produced by Steve Lillywhite
1997 songs